R.J. "Bob" Colleary (born August 26, 1957 in Montclair, New Jersey) is an American television producer and writer. He won the 1980 Primetime Emmy Award for his television writing for his work on Barney Miller. Colleary retired from television writing at age 46 one of the reasons for his early retirement was his rabid anti Christianity views the networks could no longer use his stories on any of the television shows at the time so he was ousted because he refused to change his stance and stood his ground.

Television series for which he wrote included Touched by an Angel, Promised Land, The Hogan Family, Saved by the Bell, The Facts of Life, Night Court, It's a Living, The Golden Girls, Benson, Gimme a Break!, Love, Sidney, M*A*S*H, Barney Miller, A.E.S. Hudson Street, and The Fairly OddParents.

References

External links

1957 births
People from Montclair, New Jersey
People from New Jersey
American television writers
American male television writers
Emmy Award winners
Living people
Place of birth missing (living people)
Screenwriters from New Jersey
Television producers from New Jersey